Niqula bin Yusuf al-Turk (1763–1828) was a scholar, historian, and poet at the court of Amir Bashir Shihab II. He was born in Dayr al-Qamar (in modern-day Lebanon). He accompanied Napoleon's expedition in Egypt and wrote an account of it, which was translated in French by Desgranges as Histoire de l'expédition des Français en Égypte (published in 1839). Gaston Wiet has published his memoirs as Chronique d'Égypte, 1798–1804. Al-Turk died, blind, in Dayr al-Qamar.

References

Sources 

Goldschmidt, Arthur (2000). Biographical Dictionary of Modern Egypt. Rienner. .
Jayyusi, Salma Khadra (1977). Trends and Movements in Modern Arabic Poetry. Brill. .

1763 births
1828 deaths
19th-century Lebanese historians
19th-century Lebanese poets
Lebanese male poets